Yordan Stefanov Yovkov (November 9, 1880 – October 15, 1937) was a prominent Bulgarian writer from the interwar period.

Biography
Born in the village of Zheravna, Yovkov studied at First Sofia Men’s High School, from which he graduated in 1900 with honors, and became a teacher. After teaching for one year in a village in central Bulgaria he entered into the School for Reserve Officers in Knyazhevo as a cadet, before moving to Sofia University to study law in 1904.

When the First Balkan War began in 1912, he received the rank of enlisted, and along with his brother Kosta, joined the 41st division (probably 41st regiment) at Bourgas. He was wounded by a bullet in his leg fighting in the Second Balkan War in 1913, during a battle near Doyran. Following this, he settled in Sofia and became an editor of the People’s Army (Narodna Armiya) magazine, and then librarian for the Minister of Interior Affairs and editor of a state publication.

During World War I, he was sent to work as a border officer at the Greek border near the Mesta River. Whilst there he received a summons to work as a correspondent for the paper Military News.

He spent years teaching in Varna until the autumn of 1920, after which he served as a press secretary in the Bulgarian legislation in Bucharest. He was demoted in 1927 for unspecified reasons, which caused him to resign and return to Sofia.

Literary work and legacy
Yovkov’s war experiences greatly influenced his mentality and style of writing. Whereas his first literary effort was a short story about village life and patriarchal customs, published in 1910, his post-war pieces were more harsh and militaristic.
Eventually he moved away from melancholic, depressive themes towards authentic descriptions of villagers and country life.
In his short story  Shibil, he used turkisms to give a sense of realism to the work.
His works Legends of Stara Planina (1927, Staroplaninski legendi, alternately known as the Balkan Legends ) and Inn at Antimovo (1927) established him as a major writer. In 1929, he received the Cyril and Methodius Prize for Literature from the Bulgarian Academy of Science.

His other works include the dramas Albena (1930) and Boryana (1932); a comedy The Millionaire (1930, Milionerut); and a book, The Family by the Frontier (1934, Chiflikut krai granitsata). "Albena" (1962) - libretto Peter Filchev (after the drama of Yordan Yovkov) and "Millionaire" (1965) were made into operas by Parashkev Hadjiev.

A number of his stories were made into films, including Nai-vyarnata strazha (The Most Loyal Guard, film in 1929); Shibil (1968); Nona (1973, from the novel Chiflikut krai granitsata); 24 Chasa duzhd (1982, based on the novel Chastinyat uchitel); and Serafim(short movie, 2017).

Honors
Yovkov’s natal home in Zheravna was turned into a museum in 1957.

In 1985, a dam in northeastern Bulgaria was named after him. Yovkovtsi Dam, situated 5 km from the town of Elena, supplies water to Veliko Turnovo and surrounding areas.  It is 223,000 decares in size and is a hygienic protected zone.

Yovkov Point on Greenwich Island, South Shetland Islands, Antarctica is named for Yordan Yovkov.

There is a bust of Yovkov in the park behind Vasil Levski National Stadium in Sofia.

The village Yovkovo in General Toshevo Municipality in Dobrich Province is named after him.

References

External links
 

1880 births
1937 deaths
Bulgarian writers
Bulgarian educators
People from Sliven Province
Bulgarian military personnel of the Balkan Wars
Bulgarian World War I poets
Eastern Orthodox Christians from Bulgaria
Recipients of the Order of Military Merit (Bulgaria)